F♯ A♯ ∞ (pronounced "F-sharp, A-sharp, Infinity") is the debut studio album by Canadian post-rock band Godspeed You! Black Emperor. It was first released on August 14, 1997 through Constellation Records on a single LP and on June 8, 1998 through Kranky on CD.  The CD version and the LP version have substantial differences between them.  Recorded at the Hotel2Tango in the Mile End of Montreal, the album, as became common for the band, is devoid of traditional lyrics and is mostly instrumental, featuring lengthy songs segmented into movements. It was initially released in limited quantities, and distributed through live performances and developed a cult following via word of mouth.

Background
In 1995, Mauro Pezzente moved into a loft with his then-girlfriend in Mile End, Montreal. Pezzente used the flat as a performance venue, dubbing it the Gallery Quiva. Around 1996, fumes from the mechanic's garage below the loft forced them to vacate it. Shortly after their departure, Efrim Menuck moved into the space and established Hotel2Tango, serving both as a recording studio and practice space. There, in 1997, the original recording of F♯ A♯ ∞ took place. By this time, the band had reached an unwieldy 15 members. In preparation of the album, they trimmed their numbers to ten.

The culmination of material spanning back to 1993 resulted in two lengthy songs, each about 20 minutes in length. After the record's release, the band became interested in touring the United States. In order to make headway, they sent a copy of their album to the Chicago-based record label Kranky. Impressed by the recording, Kranky offered to re-release the album on compact disc. The re-worked version of the album included several new sections, resulting in three movements and slightly over an hour of music, nearly doubling the previous runtime. This new version was released in June 1998.

Music
Each track features field recordings and sampled sounds, once referred to by David Keenan of The Wire as "eschatological tape loops". The overall theme of the album is often pinned as apocalyptic. Indeed, English director Danny Boyle was heavily inspired by the album during the making of 28 Days Later. During an interview with The Guardian, he explained, "I always try to have a soundtrack in my mind [when creating a film]. Like when we did Trainspotting, it was Underworld. For me, the soundtrack to 28 Days Later was Godspeed. The whole film was cut to Godspeed in my head."

The CD version and the LP version have substantial differences between them. Note that the following track descriptions describe the tracks of the CD version and will not accurately reflect the music of the LP version.

The opening track, "The Dead Flag Blues", begins with an ominous introduction which originates from an unfinished screenplay by guitarist Efrim Menuck. Backed by a string melody, the speaker describes a derelict city, where the government is corrupt and the inhabitants are drunks. The introduction is followed by the sounds of a train and high-volume suspended noise. This eventually develops into a Western-themed melody, and is capped off by an upbeat section which includes glockenspiel, violin, and slide guitar.

The second track, "East Hastings", is named after East Hastings Street in Vancouver's blighted Downtown Eastside. It begins with bagpipes reprising the theme of "The Dead Flag Blues" and backing the shouts of a street preacher. The sermon slowly quiets, and is replaced with the movement "The Sad Mafioso...", an edited version of which appeared in the film 28 Days Later. The movement also contains a brief portion where the band quietly sings in a rare occurrence of vocals. The track concludes with a series of electronic noises and buzzing until throbbing bass takes over.

The final track, "Providence", is considerably longer than the first two, coming in around 30 minutes in length. James Oldham of NME described it as "part The Good, the Bad and the Ugly and part Spiritualized drone freakout". The introduction features a vox pop interviewee who references "A Country Boy Can Survive" by Hank Williams Jr. The speaker is quickly replaced with a cello piece accompanied by glockenspiel, violin, and horn. Percussion is added to the melody which peaks, and is continued by a sample of Hazel Dickens singing Gathering Storm, written by Mason Daring for the film Matewan. A quasi-military movement titled, "Kicking Horse on Broken Hill", follows, and is eventually taken over by the sung phrase "Where are you going? Where are you going?" The voice is sampled from the song "By My Side", from the 1970 musical Godspell. A collage of sounds and drones then round off the track. After a period of silence, a brief coda named for the American musician John Lee Hooker is performed.

Packaging

The title of the album is pronounced "F-sharp, A-sharp, Infinity". This is a reference to the tuning of the guitars used by the band and to the endless loop at the end. The compact disc version does not contain the loop.

The original five-hundred records' jackets were handmade by the band, their record label, and local Montreal artists. One of three original photographs—depicting a watertower, train, or road sign—was glued onto the cover. The sleeve and jacket made no mention of the track titles. They were instead scratched into the run-off groove of the record, accompanied by the catalog number and side indication.

Inside of the jacket was an envelope filled with inserts. The contents included an old handbill, the album's credit sheet, a picture drawn by guitarist Efrim Menuck, and a Canadian penny crushed by a train. A silk-screened image dedicated to the blues musician Reverend Gary Davis was also included in the jacket. Barb Stewart of Stylus Magazine and Mike Galloway of NOW called the packaging and inserts "beautiful". After numerous re-pressings, the assembly process was streamlined. However, the record still ships, to this day, with virtually the same packaging elements as the originals. Modern pressings include a United States penny rather than a Canadian one, as Canadian pennies are no longer minted.

The compact disc version of the album is much simpler artistically. Guitarist David Bryant once referred to the packaging as a "jewel-cased CD monstrosity", preferring the original handcrafted record. The photograph of a road sign was chosen as the cover image, and was enlarged and darkened significantly from the original. Inside of the case are liner notes and images, including the "Faulty Schematics of a Ruined Machine", the hand drawn picture by Efrim Menuck present in the record.

Reception

Originally, the band had planned to self-release the album as a double 7" record set. The idea was scrapped after Don Wilkie and Ian Ilavsky, founders of the independent record label Constellation and co-producers of the album, offered to release it as their third record. The album was released in August 1997, and was initially limited to five-hundred hand-packaged and numbered LPs. The first release of F♯ A♯ ∞ was reviewed by a scant number of critics. Stylus Magazine wrote that the record was "innovative and inventive" and that it "stakes out unique territory in a world overrun with hackneyed experimentation". Gordon Krieger of Exclaim! described it as a "slow soundtrack of regret and desire, equal parts morose and expectant".  Montreal-based Hour magazine said the lengthy tracks "could be really pretentious but the sounds [the band] make are way too cool to be merely coldly superior". Chart Attack magazine went on to rank the two-track record as #46 on their list of the top 50 Canadian albums of all time.

Reviews of the second release were generally positive and more widespread. The album placed fourth in The Wires 1998 critics' poll. Marc Gilman of AllMusic said that "the music on [the] album is unique and powerful" and that someone "would be hard-pressed to find any imitators of [Godspeed's] revolutionary musical form". Magnet commented that the three tracks can be "served up as staggering psychedelia for a headphone or surround-sound context", voting it number 38 on their list of the best albums from 1993 to 2003. The NME called it a "genuine classic", noting the variety of sounds present in the album. Pitchfork founder and critic Ryan Schreiber remarked that, of the many experimental bands around, Godspeed You! Black Emperor were "one of the few that [haven't] left out beauty and emotion in their pieces". Pitchfork later ranked the album number 45 on their list of the top 100 albums of the 1990s.

Track listing

Notes

LP
Names of movements are not actually given anywhere in the LP release; these are extrapolated from the CD release.
The final movement on side one does not have a corresponding segment on the CD release.
Time lengths given are approximations due to the record's locked groove.

CD
"J.L.H. Outro" was named in honor of John Lee Hooker. On the CD edition it is a hidden track that begins after approximately 3 minutes and 30 seconds of silence after the end of "Providence".

Personnel

Godspeed You! Black Emperor
Aidan Girt – drums
Bruce Cawdron – percussion
Christophe – violin
David Bryant – guitar
Efrim Menuck – electric guitar
Grayson Walker – bag pipes (CD only)
Mauro Pezzente – bass guitar
Mike Moya – guitar, banjo
Norsola Johnson – cello
Thea Pratt – French horn
Thierry Amar – bass guitar

Guest musicians
All guest musicians are credited in the liner notes of the album. No surnames or instruments played are given.
Amanda
Colin
D.
Dan O.
Jesse
Peter
Shnaeberg
Steph
Sylvain

Production and design
Ian Ilavsky – production, mixing
Godspeed You! Black Emperor – production, mixing
Arthur John Tinholt – locomotive etching
Don Wilkie – production, mixing

Notes
αThe singing takes place during "The Sad Mafioso..." movement, and spans from 8:20 to 8:50. It is only included on the Compact Disc version. Live performances also contain the singing. Examples can be heard here and here at the 13:30 and 11:37 marks, respectively.

βThe speaker closely quotes the first verse, with some small changes. Lyrics for the song "A Country Boy Can Survive" can be found here.

References

External links
F♯ A♯ ∞ at MusicBrainz
F♯ A♯ ∞ at Last.fm

1997 debut albums
Constellation Records (Canada) albums
Godspeed You! Black Emperor albums
Instrumental rock albums
Kranky albums